Sufian (also Romanized as Şūfīān, Şowfyān, and Sūfīyān) is a village in Haq Rural District, Nalus District, Oshnavieh County, West Azerbaijan Province, Iran. At the 2006 census, its population was 975, in 159 families.

References 

Populated places in Oshnavieh County